Censuses in Poland:
18th-19th centuries
Poland was partitioned between German Prussia, Russian Empire, and Austria-Hungary since the 1770s.
 Russian Empire Census (Privislinsky Krai census of 1897)
 German census of 1895 (Province of Posen, Province of Silesia, Province of Pomerania, West Prussia, Province of Brandenburg)
 Austro-Hungarian census (Grand Duchy of Cracow, Kingdom of Galicia and Lodomeria)
20th century
 Polish census of 1921
 Polish census of 1931
 Polish census of 1950
 Polish census of 1960
 Polish census of 1970
 Polish census of 1978
 Polish census of 1988
21st century
 Polish census of 2002
 Polish census of 2011
 Polish census of 2021

In addition to proper census, there were also:
the 
microcensus (representative surveys) of 1974, 1984 and 1995
surveys of agricultural population

Polish people were also subject to census during times when Polish territories were partitioned before 1918, in Austro-Hungary, Russian Empire and Imperial Germany (Census in Germany).

See also
Central Statistical Office (Poland)

References
 Joanna Strzelecka, Powszechne spisy ludności, Kancelaria Sejmu, Biuro  Studiów i Ekspertyz, Informacja Nr 890, 4/2002

Demographics of Poland